Heisler is a surname. Notable people with the surname include:

 Charlene Heisler (1961–1999), Canadian astronomer
 Charles L. Heisler, American steam locomotive designer
Conrad Heisler, character in The Angry Hills (film)
 Gregory Heisler (born 1954), American photographer
 Jindřich Heisler, a Czech surrealist poet, friend of Toyen
 L. Heisler Ball (1861–1932), physician and Delaware Senator
 Mark Heisler, a sports writers and author
 Marcy Heisler (born 1967), musical theater writer and performer
 Mike Heisler, American comic book writer
 Todd Heisler (born 1972), American photojournalist
 Randy Heisler (born 1961), American Olympic discus thrower
 Stuart Heisler (1896–1979), film and television director

See also
 Heisler locomotive, a geared steam locomotive
 Heisler Locomotive Works, the American locomotive construction firm
 Heisler Beer, a fictional brand of beer seen in movies and television shows
 Heisler Industries, makers of the Bail-O-Matic packaging equipment
 Klaus Heisler, a talking fish character in the American television series American Dad!

Other
 Heissler